Oecia is a monotypic moth genus first described by Lord Walsingham in 1897. It is in the family Autostichidae. Its only species, Oecia oecophila, described by Otto Staudinger in 1876, is widely distributed in the West Indies, Central America and South America, southern Europe, Japan, northern and southern Africa, Malaya, Java, Indonesia, Australia and Hawaii. It has been widely dispersed by commerce.

The wingspan is about 10 mm for males and 13 mm for females.

The larvae are coprophagous and detritophagous.

References

External links

Japanese Moths
 Images representing  Oecia at Consortium for the Barcode of Life

Holcopogoninae
Insects of the Democratic Republic of the Congo
Moths of Japan
Moths of Europe
Moths of Africa
Coprophagous insects
Monotypic moth genera
Taxa named by Thomas de Grey, 6th Baron Walsingham